Three ships of the French Navy have borne the name Charlemagne in honour of Charlemagne

Ships named Charlemagne 
 , a 74-gun ship of the line
 , an 80-gun ship of the line
 , a pre-dreadnought battleship

Notes and references

Notes

References

Bibliography 
 
 

French Navy ship names